Cyperus altomicroglumis is a species of sedge that is endemic to an area in Somalia.

The species was first formally described by the botanist Kåre Arnstein Lye in 1997.

See also
 List of Cyperus species

References

altomicroglumis
Flora of Somalia
Plants described in 1997
Taxa named by Kåre Arnstein Lye